Tim Graham  is a journalist who writes for The Athletic. He is a "TSN Drive" co-host on TSN 1050-AM in Toronto and an adjunct professor at Canisius College. His work has appeared in the Best American Sports Writing anthology series.

Graham had two stints at The Buffalo News, the second beginning as an enterprise reporter in 2011. He joined ESPN.com in 2008 after covering the Miami Dolphins for the Palm Beach Post. Graham previously spent eight years in the Buffalo News sports department, where he was an award-winning NHL and boxing writer. He served two terms as Boxing Writers Association of America president. Before moving to Buffalo, the Baldwin-Wallace College grad covered hockey, UNLV sports and sports broadcasting for the Las Vegas Sun. He also worked at the Boston Herald and the Morning Journal in Lorain, Ohio.

In 2018, he left The Buffalo News amid a wave of buyouts at the newspaper. Unlike some of his colleagues who had their positions terminated in an effort to force them to leave (The Buffalo News union contract forbids outright layoffs or firings), Graham was not offered a buyout and chose to leave for The Athletic at the same time as the buyouts were offered.

References

Year of birth missing (living people)
Living people
American sportswriters